Parachrostia sugii is a moth of the family Erebidae first described by Michael Fibiger in 2008. It is known from Japan's Ryukyu Islands, Iriomote and Ishigaki.

Adults have been found in August, but probably occur in several generations.

The wingspan is 9.5–11 mm. The forewing is relatively narrow with a bright, ovoid, yellow reniform stigma. The crosslines are all present and black or brown and waved. The terminal line is marked by tight black interveinal spots. The hindwing is grey, with an indistinct discal spot. The underside of the forewing is brownish and beige, without a pattern. The underside of the hindwing is brownish and light brown, with a discal spot.

References

Micronoctuini
Taxa named by Michael Fibiger
Moths described in 2008